Corazón  is a 1947 Argentine film directed by Carlos F. Borcosque and starring Narciso Ibáñez Menta.

Cast
 Narciso Ibáñez Menta		
 Juan Carlos Barbieri		
 Salvador Lotito		
 Marcos Zucker		
 Luis Zaballa		
 Diana Ingro		
 Carmen Llambí		
 Félix Gil		
 Juan Fontanals		
 Enrique Lerós		
 Juan Carlos Altavista		
 Alberto Berco	... 	Extra
 Diego Marcote		
 Agustín Orrequia

References

External links
 

1947 films
1940s Spanish-language films
Argentine black-and-white films
Films based on works by Edmondo De Amicis
Films directed by Carlos F. Borcosque
Films based on Italian novels
1940s Argentine films